Atakan Yüksel (born August 13, 1985) is a Turkish wrestler competing in the 66 kg division of Greco-Roman style. The  athlete is a member of ASKİ Club in Ankara, where he is coached by Mehmet Akif Pirim.

He qualified for the 2012 Summer Olympics. In March 2021, he competed at the European Qualification Tournament in Budapest, Hungary hoping to qualify for the 2020 Summer Olympics in Tokyo, Japan.

References

External links
 

1985 births
Living people
People from Şefaatli
Olympic wrestlers of Turkey
Wrestlers at the 2012 Summer Olympics
Turkish male sport wrestlers
Mediterranean Games gold medalists for Turkey
Competitors at the 2013 Mediterranean Games
World Wrestling Championships medalists
Mediterranean Games medalists in wrestling
European Wrestling Championships medalists
20th-century Turkish people
21st-century Turkish people